Catherine Wessinger is an American religion scholar. She is the Rev. H. James Yamauchi, S.J. Professor of the History of Religions at Loyola University New Orleans where she teaches religious studies with a main research focus on millennialism, new religions, women and religion, and religions of India. Wessinger is co-general editor of Nova Religio: The Journal of Alternative and Emergent Religions. She served as a consultant to federal law enforcement during the Montana Freemen standoff and has been cited for her expertise concerning the Branch Davidians and other apocalyptic groups. She is the editor of the Women in Religions series at New York University Press and she is co-editor of the Women in the World's Religions and Spirituality Project, part of the World Religions and Spirituality Project.

Bibliography

Books
Annie Besant and Progressive Messianism. 1988. Edwin Mellen Press.
(Editor) Women's Leadership in Marginal Religions: Explorations Outside the Mainstream. 1993. University of Illinois Press.
(Editor) Religious Institutions and Women's Leadership: New Roles Inside the Mainstream. 1996. University of South Carolina Press.
(Editor) Millennialism, Persecution, and Violence: Historical Cases. 2000. Syracuse University Press.
How the Millennium Comes Violently: From Jonestown to Heaven’s Gate. 2000.  Seven Bridges Press.
(Editor) Memories of the Branch Davidians: Autobiography of David Koresh's Mother. By Bonnie Haldeman. 2007. Baylor University Press.
(Editor) When They Were Mine: Memoirs of a Branch Davidian Wife and Mother. By Sheila Martin. 2009. Baylor University Press.
(Editor) Oxford Handbook of Millennialism. 2011. Oxford University Press.
(Editor with Matthew D. Wittmer) A Journey to Waco: Autobiography of a Branch Davidian by Clive Doyle. 2012. Rowman & Littlefield.
 Theory of Women in Religions. 2020. New York University Press. 

Book Chapters
"Hinduism Arrives in America: The Vedanta Societies and the Self-Realization Fellowship." In America's Alternative Religions, ed. Timothy Miller, 173-90. State University of New York Press, 1995.
"Millennialism With and Without the Mayhem." In Millennium, Messiahs, and Mayhem, ed. Thomas Robbins and Susan J. Palmer, 47-59. Routledge, 1997.
"The Branch Davidians and Religion Reporting: A Ten-Year Retrospective." In Expecting the End: Millennialism in Social and Historical Context, ed. Kenneth G. C. Newport and Crawford Gribben, 147-72. Baylor University Press, 2006.
"New Religious Movements and Violence." In New and Alternative Religious Movements in America, ed. Eugene V. Gallagher and W. Michael Ashcraft. Vol. 1: History and Controversies, 165-205. Praeger, 2006.
(co-authored with Dell deChant and William Michael Ashcraft) "Theosophy, New Thought, and New Age Movements." In The Encyclopedia of Women and Religion in North America, ed. Rosemary Radford Ruether and Rosemary Skinner Keller. Vol. 2: 753-68. Indiana University Press, 2006.
"Charismatic Leaders in New Religious Movements." In Cambridge Companion to New Religious Movements, ed. Olav Hammer and Mikael Rothstein, 80-96. Cambridge University Press, 2012.
"The Second Generation Leaders of the Theosophical Society (Adyar)." In Brill Handbook of the Theosophical Current, ed. Olav Hammer and Mikael Rothstein, 80-96. Cambridge University Press, 2012.
"Apocalypse and Violence." In The Oxford Handbook of Apocalyptic Literature, ed. John J. Collins, 422-40. Oxford University Press, 2014.
"Millennialism." In The Bloomsbury Companion to New Religious Movements, ed. George D. Chryssides and Benjamin E. Zeller, 133-48. London: Bloomsbury, 2014.
"The FBI's 'Cult War' against the Branch Davidians." In The FBI and Religion: Faith and National Security before and after 9/11, ed. Sylvester A. Johnson and Steven Weitzman, 203-331. University of California Press, 2017.
"Collective Martyrdom and Religious Suicide: The Branch Davidians and Heaven's Gate." In The Oxford Handbook of Martyrdom, Self-Sacrifice, and Annihilation: Religious Perspectives on Suicide, ed. Margo Kitts, 54-84. Oxford University Press, 2018.
"Millennialism." In Critical Terms in Futures Studies, ed. Paul Heike, 191-98. Palgrave Macmillan, 2019.

Journal Articles
“Deaths in the Fire at the Branch Davidians’ Mount Carmel: Who Bears Responsibility?” Nova Religio: Journal of Alternative and Emergent Religions 13, no. 2 (November 2009): 25-60.
“Lee Hancock Collection: Federal and State Materials on the Branch Davidian Case,” Nova Religio: Journal of Alternative and Emergent Religions 13, no. 2 (November 2009): 114-25.

References

External links
 Catherine Wessinger Academia.edu page

Living people
Researchers of new religious movements and cults
American religion academics
Loyola University New Orleans faculty
Year of birth missing (living people)